The Midtown Tunnel may refer to:

 Queens-Midtown Tunnel, a tunnel in New York City linking the boroughs of Queens and Manhattan
 Midtown Tunnel (Virginia), a tunnel in Virginia linking the cities of Portsmouth and Norfolk

See also
 Midtown (disambiguation)
 Tunnel (disambiguation)